Niedenthal is a surname. Notable people with the surname include:

 Clemens Niedenthal
 Chris Niedenthal (born 1950), British/Polish photographer and photojournalist
 Paula M. Niedenthal, American social psychologist 

German-language surnames
Jewish surnames